Eagle Point is an unincorporated community located in the town of Eagle Point, Chippewa County, Wisconsin, United States.

History
A post office called Eagle Point was established in 1884, and remained in operation until it was discontinued in 1913. The community took its name from the nearby bluff Eagle Point, where a Civil War regiment caught a bald eagle they kept as a military mascot.

References

Unincorporated communities in Chippewa County, Wisconsin
Unincorporated communities in Wisconsin